Kim Sang-woo (born July 3, 1993), known professionally as Roy Kim, is a South Korean singer-songwriter and radio presenter. He began his singing career after winning the television talent show Superstar K 4 in 2012.

Kim officially debuted with the studio album, Love Love Love (2013), which included the hit single "Bom Bom Bom." The album garnered Kim awards for best new artist at the 15th Mnet Asian Music Awards and the 2014 Golden Disc Awards. Kim followed up his first album with the studio albums, Home (2014) and The Great Dipper (2015), and the extended play, Blooming Season (2017). He has also contributed to soundtracks for television series including Reply 1994, Pinocchio, Another Miss Oh, and Guardian: The Lonely and Great God.

Early life and education
Roy Kim was born Kim Sang-woo in Seoul, South Korea, on July 3, 1993. His father is a former executive of Seoul Takju, a prominent makgeolli liquor manufacturer. His mother is an artist. Jung Yoon-hye, formerly of the girl group Rainbow, is Kim's cousin.

During his elementary and middle school years, Kim attended Kyung Bok Elementary School and Whimoon Middle School.He was sent to Asheville, North Carolina in the United States to attend  Asheville School which he graduated from in 2012.

Kim was accepted to attend Georgetown University in Washington, D.C. in 2012, but he delayed his enrollment to audition for Superstar K 4. He entered his first year at Georgetown in 2013 and alternated between attending school in the United States and pursuing his music career in South Korea. He was majoring in sociology, which he said is "helpful for writing lyrics." In May 2019, Kim denied preparing for Georgetown graduation ceremony, and returned to Korea to face the Burning Sun scandal's investigators after finishing his final exam. Despite the investigation, the university granted an undergraduate degree to Kim.

Career 

In 2012, Kim auditioned for Mnet's television talent show Superstar K 4 (the South Korean equivalent of American Idol). He was ultimately the season's winner, out of nearly two million applicants. Following his win, he performed at the 2012 Mnet Asian Music Awards in Hong Kong.

In June 2013, Kim released his first album, Love Love Love, which included the "mega-hit" single "Bom Bom Bom." The single topped the Gaon Digital Chart for two weeks and Billboard's K-pop Hot 100 for three weeks after its release. The album's title track, "Love Love Love" reached No. 2 on the Gaon chart and No. 4 on the Billboard chart. Following the release of his first album, Kim won several awards, including Best New Male Artist at the 2013 Mnet Asian Music Awards, 20's Booming Star at the 2013 Mnet 20's Choice Awards, and Rookie of the Year and the Popularity Award at the 2014 Golden Disc Awards.

Kim released his second album, Home, in October 2014. The album's lead single, also named "Home," was a success, topping South Korea's real-time music charts upon its release and reaching No. 2 on the Gaon Digital Chart. That month, Kim embarked on a South Korean tour to promote the album. In November, he contributed to the soundtrack for the television series Pinocchio, with the song, "Pinocchio," for which he won Best Original Soundtrack at the 2015 APAN Star Awards and Favorite Foreign Artist at the 2015 Hito Music Awards in Taiwan. Kim also became the first foreign artist to perform at the Hito Music Awards since they were established in 2003.

In December 2015, Kim released his third album, The Great Dipper. The album's title track was a ballad, which was a departure from Kim's previous acoustic folk singles. At the end of the year, Kim performed at three solo concerts in Seoul, all of which had sold out before the release of his album.

Kim released his first extended play, Blooming Season, in May 2017. In February 2018, he released the single "Only Then," which topped Korean music charts upon its release, and which received a Platinum certification for digital sales by Gaon in November. For the song, Kim won Best Ballad at the 2018 Melon Music Awards, Best Male Artist at the 2018 Mnet Asian Music Awards, and a Digital Bonsang at the 2019 Golden Disc Awards.

In September 2022, it was confirmed that Kim would release a new album in October, the first after his discharge from military service. On October 7, 2022, Kim released a photo of his new single "Take Me Back In Time" via his official SNS. The single was released on October 14. This pre-release single will be followed by the release of his fourth full album And on October 25.

Personal life

Military service 
On May 27, 2020, Kim released his self-produced single "Linger On", which is his first single in 1 year and 8 months, and will be his last single before enlisting into the Republic of Korea Marine Corps for his mandatory military enlistment on June 15. On December 2, 2021, it was reported that Kim will be discharged from military service on December 14, 2021, without returning to the unit after his last vacation in accordance with the Ministry of Defense guidelines for preventing the spread of COVID-19.

Discography

 Love Love Love (2013)
 Home (2014)
 The Great Dipper (2015)
 And (2022)

Concerts and tours

Headliner

Participant

Radio presenting

Filmography

Television drama

Variety shows

Music video

Goodwill ambassadors

Awards and nominations

References

External links

 

1993 births
Asheville School alumni
Georgetown University alumni
Living people
MAMA Award winners
Singers from Seoul
South Korean pop singers
South Korean radio presenters
Superstar K winners
21st-century South Korean  male singers
South Korean male singer-songwriters
Republic of Korea Marine Corps personnel
Wake One Entertainment artists